Steve Sweeney may refer to:

 Steve Sweeney (comedian), American comedian
 Steve Sweeney (American football), played for California Golden Bears and Oakland Raiders
 Stephen Sweeney, New Jersey politician
 Steve Sweeney (actor), actor in movies including the 1997 film Nil by Mouth